José Mauricio Fúnez Barrientos (born 10 March 1959), nicknamed El Güicho, is a retired Honduran football midfielder.

Club career
The moustached Fúnez played most of his career for Real España, whom he also skippered, in the Honduran Liga Nacional. He also played for Independiente Villela and C.D. Olimpia.

International career
Fúnez arrived late at the internationals scene, since he only made his debut for Honduras in a May 1991 UNCAF Nations Cup match against Panama and has earned a total of 28 caps, scoring no goals. He has represented his country in 4 FIFA World Cup qualification matches and played at the 1991 and 1993 UNCAF Nations Cups, as well as at the 1991 CONCACAF Gold Cup.

His final international was a May 1993 FIFA World Cup qualification match against Mexico.

Honours and awards

Club
C.D. Real Espana
Liga Profesional de Honduras (3):  1988–89, 1990–91, 1993–94
Honduran Cup: (1): 1992

C.D. Olimpia
Liga Profesional de Honduras (1): 1982–83

Country
Honduras
Copa Centroamericana (1): 1993,

References

External links

1959 births
Living people
Association football midfielders
Honduran footballers
Honduras international footballers
1991 CONCACAF Gold Cup players
Independiente Villela players
C.D. Olimpia players
Real C.D. España players
Liga Nacional de Fútbol Profesional de Honduras players